Endemol Shine North America is the American division of Banijay that was founded on March 15, 2002 as a merger of Shine Americas, Shine USA, and Reveille Productions.

Endemol Shine North America produces and distributes scripted and unscripted television and digital content through its global Shine 360˚ division. Endemol Shine North America has produced original series including The Biggest Loser, Tabatha Takes Over, The Face, and Parental Control; adaptations of Shine Group formats MasterChef, Minute to Win It, One Born Every Minute, and The Wall; long-running scripted shows The Office, Ugly Betty, and The Tudors; and over 20 original online series on MSN, Yahoo!, YouTube premium channels and other platforms, many of these with sponsors such as Walmart, Toyota, Kraft Foods, Subway and Microsoft. Through Endemol Shine Group's distribution arm, Endemol Shine International, Endemol Shine North America distributes to more than 150 countries.

History

As Reveille Productions
On February 14, 2008, NBC Entertainment co-chairman Ben Silverman announced the sale of Reveille Productions to Shine Group for $125 million.

As Endemol USA

As Shine America

Shine America began as Reveille Productions, an independently owned television and motion picture studio and production company based in Los Angeles. The studio was founded by Ben Silverman in March 2002. The name Reveille is based on the bugle call used to wake up military personnel; the company logo features a bugler in action.

In 2007, Silverman accepted the job as the new entertainment head at NBC. However, because of the arrangement, he could not profit from any further projects associated with Reveille but continued to work on shows prior to his NBC deal. Silverman left NBC in 2009.

In February 2008, Elisabeth Murdoch's Shine Group bought Reveille for $125 million . Also the same year, ShineReveille International made a deal with Merv Griffin Entertainment to distribute all of MGE programming overseas. 

In March 2012, Reveille became known as Shine America.

Subsidiaries
Ardaban: In 2012-03-06, Shine America announced the launch of Ardaban, with appointment of former Notional Co-President Chachi Senior as Ardaban CEO. In 2012-09-06, Ardaban CEO Chachi Senior announced Cleve Keller as Chief Development Officer.
Shine Hispanic & Latin America: In 2013-01-24, Shine Group announced Cristina Palacio was appointed as president of Shine Hispanic & Latin America.

Programs

Current
Big Brother (Co-produced by Fly on the Wall Entertainment)
Billion Dollar Buyer
Dancing with the Stars
Family Food Fight
Hunted
I'm Dying Up Here
Kingdom
LEGO Masters
MasterChef (Co-produced by One Potato Two Potato)
MasterChef Junior (Co-produced by One Potato Two Potato)
Restaurant Startup
The Wall (Co-produced by CORE Media Group)
Mirror's Edge (In production or possibly cancelled, most recent source from 2016, under license by Electronic Arts and EA DICE)

Former

Do Not Disturb (Co-produced by Principato-Young Entertainment and Fox Television Studios)
The Face
Gigantic (Co-produced by Pacific Bay Entertainment, Grady Twins Productions and TeenNick Originals)
House of Boateng (Co-produced by Sundance Channel Original)
Identity
Kath & Kim
Kung Faux
Little Britain USA (Co-produced by BBC Worldwide Americas and HBO Original Programming)
Minuto Para Ganar
My Problem with Women (Co-produced with Tennman)
Nashville Star (Co-produced by 495 Productions and NBC Universal Television)
The Office (Co-produced by Deedle-Dee Productions and Universal Television)
Parental Control (Co-produced by MTV Production Development) 
Rhett and Link: Commercial Kings (Co-produced by AMC Networks)
Riot
Shear Genius
Steve Harvey
Tabatha Takes Over
Top Gear USA (Seasons 1 and 2 only; co-produced by BBC Worldwide Americas and A&E Networks)
The Tudors (Co-produced by Showtime, Working Title Television, Octagon Films and Canadian Broadcasting Corporation)
Ugly Betty (Co-produced by Silent H Productions, Ventanarosa and ABC Studios)

Shine America
Gracepoint
Restaurant Startup
Fake Off
MasterChef (FOX)
MasterChef Junior
The Bridge
The Biggest Loser
One Born Every Minute
Ugly Betty
The Tudors
Nashville Star
The Buried Life
Kath & Kim
Commercial Kings
American Gladiators
Parental Control

International distribution 
 My Dad Is Better Than Your Dad
 Are You Smarter Than a 5th Grader?
 The Biggest Loser

See also
Shine Limited
Endemol Shine Australia
Endemol

References

External links
Shine America page
"First TV, Then the World", from Television Week (February 12, 2007)
Ben Silverman Wants Another "Ugly Betty" Hit But This Time On NBC From AHN (June 5, 2007)
From Financial Times (November 30, 2007)

Banijay
Mass media companies established in 2002
American companies established in 2002
Television production companies of the United States
Companies based in Los Angeles
2002 establishments in California
Peabody Award winners
American subsidiaries of foreign companies